Soldat ( short: S, plural Soldaten) is the lowest rank of enlisted men in the land-based armed forces of Germany, Austria and Switzerland. It is usually grouped as OR-1 within the NATO ranking system, excluding the Swiss armed services which is not part of NATO.

Germany

The German term Soldat (equivalent to Soldier in English) has its roots as far back as the 16th-century, where it was a common designation for a paid or remunerated ordinary-rank member of a military infantry, especially one who was not an officer. In the German language Sold implies "pay", and as such the term Soldat designated a person in pay (being paid) for providing armed service.

Bundeswehr
In the Federal armed forces of Germany (Bundeswehr) it can be the collective term to any person in uniform, e.g. Officers (de: Offiziere), Non-Commissioned Officers (de: Unteroffiziere), and enlisted men (de: Mannschaften).

In the Bundeswehr it is used to describe conscripts (de: Wehrpflichtiger), short/long term serving volunteers (de: Zeitsoldat, or Soldat auf Zeit), and career or regular servicemen (de: Berufssoldat).

It is grade A3 in the pay rules of the Federal Ministry of Defence.

The sequence of ranks (top-down approach) in that particular group is as follows:
OR-4a: Oberstabsgefreiter 
OR-4b: Stabsgefreiter
OR-3a: Hauptgefreiter 
OR-3b: Obergefreiter 
OR-2:  Gefreiter 
OR-1:  Soldat (Army, Air Force, Navy)

Designation
The designation of the particular OR1-rank depends on the individual branch and career of the soldier as regulated in the Zentrale Dienstvorschrift 14/5. The sole OR1-rank designation in the Marine is Matrose, and Sanitätssoldat in the Bundeswehr medical service. Other OR1-designations are descript in the table below.

Wehrmacht until 1945

See also
 Soldat (Romania)
 Ranks of the German Bundeswehr
 Rank insignia of the German Bundeswehr
 Ranks and insignia of NATO armies enlisted
 Ranks and insignia of enlisted personnel in NATO air forces

References 

Military ranks of Germany
Military ranks of Switzerland